Wilsons Hill is a rural locality in the City of Greater Bendigo in the Australian state of Victoria. The area was used for gold mining and filled in mineshafts can be found. In the south-western end of the Wilsons Hill Nature Conservation Reserve are the remains of four cyanide vats from gold processing in the 1930s.

References 

Bendigo
Towns in Victoria (Australia)
Suburbs of Bendigo